Athous subfuscus is a species of beetles in the family Elateridae and the genus Athous.

Description
Beetle in length .

References

External links
Information and Images of Athous subfuscus 

Beetles described in 1764
Dendrometrinae
Taxa named by Otto Friedrich Müller